Gaico (possibly from Quechua qayqu, a type of hunt) is a  mountain in the northern part of the Cordillera Blanca in the Andes of Peru. It is located in the Ancash Region, Corongo Province, Cusca District. Gaico lies southeast of Pacra.

References

Mountains of Peru
Mountains of Ancash Region